Kjell Berg (born March 11, 1962) is a Norwegian curler. 

Berg has played in the lead position for his entire international career. 

Berg won a silver medal at the 1983 World Junior Curling Championships playing for Pål Trulsen. He also won a silver medal at the 1992 Winter Olympics, when curling was a demonstration sport (playing for Tormod Andreassen) and two bronze medals at the European Curling Championships in 1986 and 1998.

References

External links

 

Living people
1962 births
Norwegian male curlers
Curlers at the 1992 Winter Olympics